St Philip's Church is in the village of Kelsall, Cheshire, England.  It is an active Anglican parish church in the deanery of Chester, the archdeaconry of Chester, and the diocese of Chester.  The church is recorded in the National Heritage List for England as a designated Grade II listed building.

History

The church was built in 1860 to a design by Thomas Bower of Nantwich.

Architecture

St Philip's is constructed in sandstone with a roof of Welsh slates and a red tiled ridge.  Its architectural style is Decorated.  The plan consists of a four-bay nave with a south porch, and a two-bay chancel with a north vestry.  A bellcote stands on the east end of the nave.  The windows along the sides of the church are divided by buttresses.  In the nave the windows have two-lights with alternating quatrefoil and trefoil heads, and contain plate tracery.  The chancel windows are pairs of lancets with trefoil heads.  The east window has three lights, and the west window four lights.  The vestry has a pyramidal roof.  The two-manual organ was built in 1900 by Nicholson and Lord.

External features

The churchyard contains the war graves of two soldiers of World War I, and two airmen of World War II.

See also

Listed buildings in Kelsall

References

External links
Church website

Church of England church buildings in Cheshire
Grade II listed churches in Cheshire
Churches completed in 1860
19th-century Church of England church buildings
Diocese of Chester